Jean Leclerc or Le Clerc may refer to:

 Jean Le Clerc (c.1440–1510), French official who wrote two chronicles about the life of his longstanding patron Antoine de Chabannes
 Jean LeClerc (painter) (c.1585–1633), French painter 
 Jean Le Clerc (theologian) (1657–1736), biblical scholar and encyclopaedist

 Jean Théophile Victor Leclerc (1771–1796), radical French revolutionist and newspaperman
 Jean LeClerc (actor) (born 1948), Québécois actor best known for appearing in the American soap opera All My Children
 Jean Leclerc (politician) (born 1958), Canadian politician and businessman
 Jean Leclerc (born 1961), Québécois singer better known as Jean Leloup

See also
 Jean Leclercq (disambiguation)